Morocco competed at the 2013 Mediterranean Games in Mersin, Turkey from the 20th to 30 June 2013.

Football

Men's tournament

Team

Badreddine Benrachour
Omar Boutayeb
Mohamed Saidi
Hamza Moussadak
Mohammed El Jaaouani
Adam Ennaffati
Adnane El Ouardy
Reda En-Neoualy
Youssef Es Saiydy
Mohamed Cheikhi
Walid El Karti
Aymane El Hassouni
El Mehdi Moufaddal
Hamza Mouatamid
Elmehdi Dghoughi
Reda Hajhouj
Mohamed El Makahasi
Hicham Khaloua

Standings

Results

References

Nations at the 2013 Mediterranean Games
2013
Mediterranean Games